Scott M. Ross (December 7, 1968 – September 21, 2014) was an American football linebacker who played one season with the New Orleans Saints of the National Football League (NFL). He was drafted by the Saints in the eleventh round of the 1991 NFL Draft. He played college football at the University of Southern California and attended El Toro High School in Lake Forest, California. He died of heart failure on September 21, 2014.

References

External links
Just Sports Stats

1968 births
2014 deaths
Players of American football from Sacramento, California
American football linebackers
USC Trojans football players
New Orleans Saints players